Andrew Peter Forbeck (April 29, 1881 – April 24, 1924) was a United States Navy seaman received the Medal of Honor for actions aboard  on July 16, 1900, during the Philippine American War.  Seaman Forbeck is buried in Erie Cemetery, Erie, Pennsylvania.

He is buried in Erie Cemetery Erie, Pennsylvania.

Medal of Honor citation
Rank and Organization: Seaman, U.S. Navy. Born: August 29, 18,9, New York. Accredited to: New York. G.O. No.: 55, July 19, 1901.

Citation:

For distinguished conduct in the presence of the enemy during the battle of Katbalogan, Samar, Philippine Islands, July 16, 1900.

See also
List of Medal of Honor recipients
List of Philippine–American War Medal of Honor recipients

Notes

References

1881 births
1924 deaths
Military personnel from New York City
United States Navy sailors
United States Navy Medal of Honor recipients
American military personnel of the Philippine–American War
Philippine–American War recipients of the Medal of Honor